Nikolay Bobarenko (27 November 1930 – 16 April 1996) was a Soviet cyclist. He competed in the individual and team road race events at the 1952 Summer Olympics.

References

External links
 

1930 births
1996 deaths
Soviet male cyclists
Olympic cyclists of the Soviet Union
Cyclists at the 1952 Summer Olympics